Dunay was a tall ship serving with the Soviet Navy, first launched as Cristoforo Colombo, laid at the Castellammare yards on 15 April 1926. It was destroyed in a fire in 1963.

History
In 1925, the Regia Marina (Italian Royal Navy) ordered two school ships to a design by General Lieutenant Francesco Rotundi of the Italian Navy Engineering Corps, inspired by the style of large late 18th century 74-gun ships of the line. The first, Cristoforo Colombo, was put into service in 1928 and was used by the Regia Marina until 1943. After World War II, the ship was handed over to the Soviet Union as part of the war reparations demanded by the 1947 Paris Peace Treaty, and was decommissioned in 1959.

See also
 List of ships of the Soviet Navy
 List of ships of Russia by project number

References

External links
 Cristoforo Colombo Marina Militare website

Individual sailing vessels
Cristoforo Colombo
Tall ships of Italy
Training ships
1928 ships
Full-rigged ships
Auxiliary ships of the Soviet Navy
Italy–Soviet Union relations
Maritime incidents in 1963
Ship fires